Old Lead is an album by Minneapolis Celtic rock band Boiled in Lead. It collects the band's first two studio albums, 1985's BOiLeD iN lEaD and 1987's Hotheads, along with two tracks recorded during the Hotheads sessions.

Critical reception
Chuck Lipsig of Green Man Review praised the previously unreleased song “Lovely Joan” as "one of the most intensely sensual, almost erotic, renditions I’ve heard of any traditional tune." AllMusic's Chip Renner noted that Old Lead shows a progression from the raw sound of Boiled in Lead's first album to the more polished sound of its second. Tim Walters of the guide MusicHound Folk stated that while the material on Old Lead is "less technically adept than their later releases," the band's "energy and inventiveness" are apparent.

Track listing

References

1991 compilation albums
Boiled in Lead albums